M. Shivanna (born 8 March 1948) was a member of the 14th Lok Sabha of India. He represented the Chamarajanagar constituency of Karnataka and is a member of the Janata Dal (Secular) (JD(S)) political party.

M. Shivanna was fielded by JD(S) as its candidate in the Chamarajanagar seat in the 2014 Indian general election.

External links
 Home Page on the Parliament of India's Website

References

1948 births
Living people
India MPs 2004–2009
People from Chamarajanagar
Janata Dal (Secular) politicians
Lok Sabha members from Karnataka
Candidates in the 2014 Indian general election